Malik Nadeem Kamran is a Pakistani politician who was a Member of the Provincial Assembly of the Punjab, from 1997 to 1999, from 2008 to May 2018, and from August 2018 to January 2023.

Early life and education
He was born on 3 August 1953 in Sahiwal in a Kakazai Pathan Family.

He graduated in 1974 from Bahauddin Zakariya University and has the degree of Bachelor of Arts.

Political career
He was elected to the Provincial Assembly of the Punjab as a candidate of Pakistan Muslim League (N) (PML-N) from Constituency PP-181 (Sahiwal-II) in 1997 Pakistani general election. He received 25,058 votes and defeated Rana Muhammad Aftab Ahmed Khan, a candidate of Pakistan Peoples Party (PPP).

He ran for the seat of the Provincial Assembly of the Punjab as a candidate of PML-N from Constituency PP-221 (Sahiwal-II) in 2002 Pakistani general election but was unsuccessful. He received 11,163 votes and lost the seat to Aftab Ahmed Khan, a candidate of PPP.

He was re-elected to the Provincial Assembly of the Punjab as a candidate of PML-N from Constituency PP-221 (Sahiwal-II) in 2008 Pakistani general election. He received 36,376 votes and defeated Muhammad Zaki Chaudhry, a candidate of PPP. During his second tenure as Member of the Punjab Assembly, he served in the provincial cabinet of Chief Minister Shahbaz Sharif as Provincial Minister of Punjab for Food from June 2008 to June 2010 and as Provincial Minister of Punjab for Zakat and Ushr.

He was re-elected to the Provincial Assembly of the Punjab as a candidate of PML-N from Constituency PP-221 (Sahiwal-II) in 2013 Pakistani general election. He received 55,462 votes and defeated Sheikh Muhammad Chohan, a candidate of Pakistan Tehreek-e-Insaf (PTI). In June 2013, he was inducted into the provincial cabinet of Chief Minister Shahbaz Sharif and was made Provincial Minister of Punjab for Zakat and Ushr. In June 2013, he was inducted into the provincial Punjab cabinet of Chief Minister Shehbaz Sharif and was made Provincial Minister of Punjab for Zakat and Ushr. In a cabinet reshuffle in November 2016, he was made Provincial Minister of Punjab for Planning and Development.

He was re-elected to Provincial Assembly of the Punjab as a candidate of PML-N from Constituency PP-197 (Sahiwal-II) in 2018 Pakistani general election.

References

Living people
Punjab MPAs 2013–2018
1953 births
Pakistan Muslim League (N) MPAs (Punjab)
Punjab MPAs 1997–1999
Punjab MPAs 2008–2013
Punjab MPAs 2018–2023